Rudbar (also Romanized as Rūdbar) is a city in and the capital of Rudbar-e Jonubi County, Kerman Province, Iran.  At the 2006 census, its population was 8,275, in 1,677 families.

References

Populated places in Rudbar-e Jonubi County

Cities in Kerman Province